Krewe of Thoth is a New Orleans Mardi Gras krewe.

History and formation
The Krewe of Thoth was organized in 1947 in the uptown neighborhood of New Orleans. It presented its first ball and five float parade with 50 members in 1948.

The route has traditionally gone into areas not covered by larger krewes. It typically passed a large numbers of hospitals and other care facilities with patients or residents who would not normally get a chance to see a parade.

Route
"The parade of shut-ins", as it has been known, Thoth begins at the corner of Tchoupitoulas and State Streets along the Mississippi River, proceeding westbound on Tchoupitoulas past Children's Hospital of New Orleans before turning north onto Henry Clay Avenue. It proceeds along Henry Clay until reaching Magazine Street, where it turns east. Thoth remains on Magazine until Napoleon Avenue, where it then turns north and follows the route of every other New Orleans parade except Endymion. The parade returns to Tchoupitoulas for its final leg from Canal to Poydras Streets. 

Previously, the parade began at Henry Clay and Magazine and proceeded south to Tchoupitoulas, east on Tchoupitoulas to State, then north on State to Magazine; the rest of the route was the same as it is now.

The route was originally created to pass by the Lighthouse for the Blind, Children%27s_Hospital_of_New_Orleans, the John J. Hainkel Home and Rehabilitation Center (formerly called the Home for the Incurables, founded in 1891 to house the terminally ill), the former U.S. Marine Hospital, the Poydras Home and many other locations with people who cannot physically participate in Mardi Gras.

Parade

Parade themes

Iconic floats
Thoth Tomb
Egyptian Jesters
High Priest of Thoth
The Royal Barge
His Majesty’s Entourage
The Valley Of Kings

References 

Mardi Gras in New Orleans